José Macedo Vieira (born 1949, in Beiriz, Póvoa de Varzim) is the president of the city council of Póvoa de Varzim since 1993 by the PSD party.

He is also president of LIPOR (since 2001) Residues management body of Greater Porto, Council of Administration of Varzim Lazer E.M, vice-president of Metro do Porto, SA and of Águas do Cávado, S.A.

References

People from Póvoa de Varzim
1949 births
Living people
Social Democratic Party (Portugal) politicians
Date of birth missing (living people)